The Fitna of al-Andalus (1009–1031) was a civil war in the Caliphate of Córdoba. It began in the year 1009 with a coup d'état which led to the assassination of Abd al-Rahman Sanchuelo, the son of Almanzor, the deposition of the Caliph Hisham II al-Hakam, and the rise to power of Muhammad II of Córdoba, great-grandson of Abd-ar-Rahman III. The conflict would eventually divide all of Al-Andalus into a series of Taifa Kingdoms. The Fitna finally ended with the definitive abolition of the Cordoban Caliphate in 1031, although various successor kingdoms would continue to claim the caliphate for themselves. The added pressures of financial collapse were present due to the large tax burden placed on the populace to finance the continuous war.

Throughout the conflict, various Muslim kingdoms were aided by the Christian kingdoms to the north, both in an official capacity and by mercenary Christian soldiers. Córdoba and its suburbs were repeatedly looted during the war, destroying many iconic monuments such as the Alcázar de los Reyes Cristianos and the Medina Azahara. The capital was temporarily moved to Málaga. In a little less than twenty years, 10 different caliphates emerged as successor states to the Caliphate of Córdoba (amongst them was a restored kingdom under Hisham II). Three of these successor kingdoms formed a dynastic succession line known as the Hammudid Dynasty.

Causes 

Up until the death of Al-Hakam II in the year 976, the Caliphate of Córdoba was a powerful state, both respected and feared by the Christian kingdoms to the north. After his death, his son, Hisham II al-Hakam was still a child. As a result, the vizier, Almanzor was able to easily manoeuver and seize power, usurping the Umayyad Caliphate claim and turning the Caliph into a mere puppet. The strength of the Caliphate lay in the unity of different Muslim groups, following civil wars that had drained the Emirate. To be assured in the conservation of his power, Almanzor favored the Berbers over the other groups. Similar accommodation in the pecking order was transferred to Almanzor's son Abd al-Malik al-Muzaffar when he succeeded his father to the throne. To exacerbate the situation, government security was further undermined by various plots as rival groups vied for power. Abd al-Malik died in 1008, leaving his brother, Abd al-Rahman Sanchuelo in power. Sanchuelo was able to convince Hisham II to name him the rightful heir to the Caliphate. This marked the last straw for the remaining Umayyad members who proceeded to launch a full scale coup d'état and revolt against the state.

Civil war 

Taking advantage of the absence of Sanchuelo, who had left to fight against the forces of Alfonso V of León, the Córdoba Caliphate leader Muhammad II of Córdoba in 1009 dethroned his cousin, the Caliph Hisham II al-Hakam. Sanchuelo returned quickly to Córdoba but the morale of his Berber army was low due to the lengthy campaign, and a majority of his army deserted him. As a result, he fell prisoner to Muhammad II and was executed a short while later.

Following this episode, Muhammad II's power and influence rose quickly, giving rise to a new opposition block and pitting him against another Umayyad group, led by Sulayman ibn al-Hakam. Supported by the Berbers, Sulayman was able to capture Muhammad II and became the Caliph in 1009. This chain of events, in turn, incited the Hammudid Dynasty, a powerful family from Ceuta and Algeciras, to proclaim themselves the rightful Caliphs and march on the city of Córdoba. They dethroned Sulaiman and ruled until the year 1023.

In that year a new Umayyad claimant, Abd ar-Rahman V, became Caliph. Unfortunately for him, the discontent generated by the new tax caused a new revolution and his eventual fall, as the measure devastated the population.

Three more Caliphs, two Umayyad and one Hammudi, reigned until the year 1031, when the Cordoban elite abolished the caliphate and established an independent state (taifa). However, various pretenders from different taifas claimed to be the caliph.

Consequences 

This period of chaos, initiated by the Hammudid Dynasty, led to the fragmentation of the caliphate and the establishment of the first independent Taifa kingdoms. It is important to note that the Christian kingdoms to the north were generally supportive of the havoc that wracked the Andalusi world, often lending soldiers to both sides and helping to aid an air of instability. The period that followed was not a peaceful one. After the fragmentation of the caliphate, the individual taifas fought amongst each other. The Christian kingdoms, seeing this fragmentation and opportunity to grab land, intensified the ongoing Reconquista. It was not until this direct threat to Muslim control in the Iberian Peninsula that the Almoravid dynasty finally came to Iberia to reunify Al-Andalus.

See also 
 Caliphate of Córdoba
 Almoravid dynasty
 Hammudid dynasty
 Reconquista
 Al-Andalus
 Abd al-Rahman III
 Hisham II

Bibliography
 André Clot, L'Espagne Musulmane, Ed.Perrin, 1999, 

 
11th century in Al-Andalus
1000s in Europe
1010s in Europe
1020s in Europe
1030s in Europe
Wars of succession involving the states and peoples of Europe
Wars of succession involving the states and peoples of Africa